The 2004 Laurence Olivier Awards were held in 2004 in London celebrating excellence in West End theatre by the Society of London Theatre.

Winners and nominees
Details of winners (in bold) and nominees, in each award category, per the Society of London Theatre.

Productions with multiple nominations and awards
The following 14 productions, including one opera, received multiple nominations:

 8: Jerry Springer, Pacific Overtures and Ragtime
 5: Thoroughly Modern Millie
 4: Absolutely! (Perhaps) and Mourning Becomes Electra
 3: Caligula and Hitchcock Blonde
 2: Democracy, High Society, Madama Butterfly, Of Mice and Men, Orlando and The Pillowman

The following two productions received multiple awards:

 4: Jerry Springer
 3: Pacific Overtures

See also
 58th Tony Awards

References

External links
 Previous Olivier Winners – 2004

Laurence Olivier Awards ceremonies
Laurence Olivier Awards, 2004
Laurence Olivier Awards
Laur